Eric Maxwell Johnson (born September 15, 1979) is a former American football tight end in the National Football League. He was drafted by the San Francisco 49ers in the seventh round of the 2001 NFL Draft. He played college football at Yale.

High school and college career
Johnson was born in Needham, Massachusetts. He attended Needham High School and Belmont Hill School in Massachusetts. He went on to Yale University, where he played wide receiver. He caught 21 receptions for 244 yards in Yale's come-from-behind victory against Harvard in the 1999 Harvard-Yale Game, including the game-winning touchdown catch.

Professional career
Johnson was drafted by the San Francisco 49ers in the seventh round of the 2001 NFL Draft. When healthy, he was a contributor to the 49ers passing game. However, he missed all of 2003 with an injury and missed all of 2005 with an injury as well. In 2004, he led the 49ers in receiving with 82 catches for 825 yards and two touchdowns. During the 2006 season, Johnson split time with tight end Vernon Davis, the team's first-round draft pick.

Johnson signed a one-year contract with the New Orleans Saints in 2007. He was re-signed by the team on March 14, 2008. On July 31, 2008, the Saints released him.

Personal life
Johnson was married to stylist Keri Johnson whom he officially divorced in 2010. He began dating singer and actress Jessica Simpson in January 2010. They announced their engagement that November. The couple married on July 5, 2014 at the San Ysidro Ranch, in Montecito, Santa Barbara County, California. They have three children. A daughter named Maxwell Drew Johnson, son named Ace Knute Johnson and another daughter named Birdie Mae Johnson.

References

1979 births
Living people
American football tight ends
American football wide receivers
Belmont Hill School alumni
Jessica Simpson
New Orleans Saints players
Players of American football from California
Players of American football from Massachusetts
Players of American football from San Francisco
San Francisco 49ers players
Sportspeople from Needham, Massachusetts
Sportspeople from the San Francisco Bay Area
Yale Bulldogs football players